is a role-playing video game designed by Mistwalker and developed by feelplus and Brownie Brown. It was published by AQ Interactive in Japan on September 4, 2008, and by UTV Ignition Entertainment on February 24, 2009 in North America. It is the second of three games in the Blue Dragon series, and the first of two for the Nintendo DS.

Plot
One year after the events of the original game, the world continues to embrace and explore the cube worlds that resulted from the opening of the planet's core. One day King Jibral and Zola encounter a mysterious evil three-headed dragon shadow called Balaur emerging from one of the cubes. Zola has a bad feeling about it and after informing Shu and the party, they find themselves on another adventure to discover this new threat.

Gameplay
Blue Dragon Plus is a real time strategy game. It can be played entirely with the Nintendo DS stylus. Battles initiate once the party comes in contact with the enemy, and the characters can attack automatically. Characters can also engage in Shadow Battles when an enemy with a shadow is encountered. Magic can be used when characters use their skills by summoning their shadows.

Reception

Blue Dragon Plus received "average" reviews according to the review aggregation website Metacritic. In Japan, Famitsu gave it a score of one eight, two sevens, and one eight for a total of 30 out of 40. IGN Australia gave it a favorable review over a month-and-a-half before its Australian release date.

Blue Dragon Plus entered the Japanese sales charts at number 3, selling about 21,000 units during its debut week. Sales of the game in Japan reached 58,848 units by the end of 2008.

Notes

References

External links
 Official website
 

2008 video games
AQ Interactive games
Blue Dragon (franchise)
Brownie Brown games
Mistwalker games
Nintendo DS games
Nintendo DS-only games
Role-playing video games
UTV Ignition Games games
Video game sequels
Video games developed in Japan
Video games scored by Nobuo Uematsu